The 2021 Women's Asian Individual Squash Championships is the women's edition of the 2021 Asian Individual Squash Championships, which serves as the individual Asian championship for squash players. The event took place at Mushaf Squash Complex in Islamabad from 15 to 19 December 2021.

Seeds

  Liu Tsz Ling (semifinals)
  Rachel Arnold (finals)
  Ho Tze Lok (semifinals)
  Tong Tsz Wing (champion)
  Aifa Azman (quarterfinals)
  Chan Sin Yuk (quarterfinals)
  Chan Yiwen (quarterfinals)
  Zynab Khan (first round)

  Noor Ul Huda (first round)
  Saima Shoukat (first round)
  Anam Mustafa Aziz (first round)
  Noor Ul Ain Ijaz (first round)
  Ainaa Amani (quarterfinals)
  Komal Khan (first round)
  Fathoum Issadeen (first round)
  Yeheni Kuruppu (first round)

Draw and results

Source:
Seed: 
Draw: 
Results:

See also
2021 Men's Asian Individual Squash Championships
Asian Individual Squash Championships

References

2021 in squash
Squash in Asia
International sports competitions hosted by Pakistan
Squash tournaments in Pakistan
2021 in Pakistani sport